"Free Harvard, Fair Harvard" is a campaign centered on the Harvard Board of Overseers started by Ron Unz in 2016. Its slate of candidates is Ron Unz, Lee Cheng, Stuart Taylor, Jr., Stephen Hsu, and Ralph Nader. The campaign seeks for tuition fees at Harvard to be abolished and for greater transparency in the admissions process.'''

References 

Harvard University
Education finance in the United States